Keith Ranspot (December 11, 1913 – October 1, 1977) was a professional American football player who played wide receiver for five seasons for the Chicago Cardinals, Green Bay Packers, Detroit Lions, Brooklyn Dodgers, and Boston Yanks.

References

1913 births
American football wide receivers
Boston Yanks players
Brooklyn Dodgers (NFL) players
Chicago Cardinals players
Green Bay Packers players
Detroit Lions players
SMU Mustangs football players
1991 deaths